Crazy Days (Ludi dani) is a 1977 Croatian film directed and written by Nikola Babić, starring Zvonko Lepetić and Ilija Ivezić.

Plot

In this tragicomedy about the pretensions and sorrows of Yugoslavs who go abroad to earn money, a number of foreign workers have come back home for the holidays. When one of them taunts another with having done poorly abroad, the other fellow claims that he has enough money from his jobs to paper the other fellow's ostentatious and expensive house.

References

External links
 

1977 films
Croatian drama films
1970s Croatian-language films
Yugoslav drama films